Sydnone imine is a mesoionic heterocyclic aromatic chemical compound. Sydnone imine is the imine of sydnone where the keto functional group of sydnone (=O) has been replaced with an imine (=NH) group. 

A sydnone imine substructure can be found in the drugs feprosidnine, mesocarb, molsidomine, ciclosidomine, and linsidomine.

Chemical structure

See also 

 Montréalone
 Münchnone
 Sydnone

External links
 IUPAC Goldbook entry
 Dictionary of Organic Compounds

Simple aromatic rings
Oxadiazoles
Imines